Hardoi railway station (station code HRI) is a main railway station in Hardoi district in the Indian state of Uttar Pradesh.

References 

Moradabad railway division
Hardoi